Araneus gemma, commonly known as the cat-faced spider (a name shared with Araneus gemmoides), is a common outdoor orb-weaver spider found in the western United States and Canada.

Like most Araneus species, A. gemma is harmless to humans. It contains a venomous toxin of low molecular weight called argiotoxin, that antagonizes the actions of the neurotransmitter glutamate. Dopamine was also identified in the venom of A. gemma in a concentration of 4.3 nM.

The web silk of the A. gemma ranges from 1 to 4 μm in diameter.

References

External links

 Araneus quadratus

gemma
Spiders of North America
Spiders described in 1888